Peter Johnston may refer to:

Sport
Peter Johnston (footballer, born 1957), former Australian rules footballer for Melbourne and Geelong
Peter Johnston (footballer, born 1959), former Australian rules footballer for Fitzroy
Peter Johnston (rugby league, born 1963), former Canterbury, Eastern Suburbs and Newcastle player
Peter Johnston (rugby league, born 1968), former Parramatta, South Sydney and Illawarra player
Peter Johnstone (rugby union) (1922–1997), former New Zealand international rugby player
Peter Johnstone Park, a sports ground in Mosgiel, New Zealand, named after him
Peter Johnston (tennis) (born 1960), Australian tennis player

Other
Peter Johnston (BBC) (born 1965), Controller of BBC Northern Ireland
Peter Johnston (Canadian politician), Canadian Green Party political candidate
Peter Johnston (Wisconsin politician) (1831–1904), Wisconsin State Assemblyman
Peter Johnston Jr. (1763–1831), Virginia politician

See also
Peter Johnson (disambiguation)
Peter Johnstone (disambiguation)